The 1995 Asian Judo Championships were held in New Delhi, India 20, 21 and 23 November 1995.

Medal overview

Men's events

Women's events

Medals table

References

External links
 
 Judo Union of Asia

Asian Championships
Asian Judo Championships
Asian Judo Championships
International sports competitions hosted by India
1990s in Delhi
Sport in New Delhi
Judo competitions in India